Pareiorhina rudolphi is a species of armored catfish endemic to Brazil where it occurs in the Paraíba do Sul River near Lorena, São Paulo State, Brazil.  This species grows to a length of  TL.

The fish is named in honor of Rodolpho von Ihering (1883-1939), a zoologist and fish culturist, who first described this catfish as Plecostomus (Rhinelepis) microps in 1907, but used a preoccupied name (Plecostomus microps Steindachner 1876) and so it was renamed.

References
 

Loricariidae
Fish of South America
Fish of Brazil
Endemic fauna of Brazil
Taxa named by Alípio de Miranda-Ribeiro
Fish described in 1911